Anton Artyomovich Efremov (born 11 June 2003) is a Russian professional footballer who plays as a central defender. He plays for Spanish club Villarreal CF C.

Club career
Efremov began at the DYuTs Sormovo municipal academy in the Sormovo City District of Nizhny Novgorod. In this subsidiary club of the FC Volga Nizhny Novgorod, his coach for 3 seasons was the Spanish José Luis Lorenzo Ortega, who sent reports to Villarreal CF where he reported the quality of the player. Despite the reports, FC Lokomotiv Moscow moved faster and signed the player where he spent 3 seasons.

In the 2019-20 season, his first year as a youth, he remained on Villarreal training with Juvenil A but was unable to debut in the league due to bureaucratic delays with his visa in Spain. This tired the player who returned to Russia to play for the FC Chertanovo Moscow academy where he received the opportunity to debut in the Russian Football National League on 17 October 2020 in a game against FC Veles Moscow at only 17 years old, just started his youth stage. and another game in the Russian Cup, at just 17 years old, just beginning his youth stage.

In July 2021, Villarreal CF decided to make every effort to sign Antón Efremov, signing him as a property with a professional contract until June 30, 2024. After his signing, the Villarreal football department cataloged him as their new Pau Torres. In the 2022-23 season, Efremov will play his first season in senior football in Villarreal's second reserve team at the Tercera Federación.

References

External links
 Profile by Russian Football National League
 

2003 births
Sportspeople from Nizhny Novgorod
Living people
Russian footballers
Russia youth international footballers
Association football defenders
Association football central defenders
FC Chertanovo Moscow players
Villarreal CF C players
Russian expatriate footballers
Expatriate footballers in Spain